Sunbury Bus Service is a bus operator in Melbourne, Australia. It operates seven routes under contract to Public Transport Victoria. It is a subsidiary of the Donric Group.

History
Sunbury Bus Service was formed by Richard Baird and Don McKenzie in March 1980 following the purchase of the business of WJ Treweek. It is today part of the Donric Group.

Fleet
As at February 2023, the fleet consisted of 108 buses and coaches. Fleet livery is white with red & black stripes.

References

External links

Company website

Bus companies of Victoria (Australia)
Bus transport in Melbourne
Transport companies established in 1980
1980 establishments in Australia
Transport in the City of Hume